Kalateh-ye Mohammadabad (also Romanized as Kalāteh-ye Moḩammadābād; also known as Kalāteh-ye Shāh Moḩammad) is a village in Pain Velayat Rural District, in the Central District of Kashmar County, Razavi Khorasan Province, Iran. At the 2006 census, its population was 14, in 4 families.

References 

Populated places in Kashmar County